Lucinda Mary J Raikes (born 14 April 1971 in Cambridge) is an English actress, most noted for playing Karen Ball in the sitcom Green Wing and Angela Heaney in The Thick of It and its spin off film In the Loop. She has also appeared in Sensitive Skin, Extras, Casanova and 15 Storeys High.

Film

Television

Theatre

References

External links
 

1971 births
Living people
English television actresses